"How Do" is a song written and recorded by American country music artist Mary Chapin Carpenter.  It was released in April 1989 as the first single from the album State of the Heart.  The song reached #19 on the Billboard Hot Country Singles & Tracks chart.

Content
"How Do" is described by an uncredited article in The Tennessean as "portray[ing] a woman who has set her sights on entertaining a man who's obviously new in town". The same publication also stated that the song contained numerous electric guitar and steel guitar fills.

Chart performance

References

1989 singles
Mary Chapin Carpenter songs
Songs written by Mary Chapin Carpenter
Columbia Records singles
1989 songs